Rope is a 1957 Australian television film based on the play Rope by Patrick Hamilton. It was presented in real time.

Broadcast live in Sydney, it was kinescoped/telerecorded for showing in Melbourne (these were the only Australian cities with TV at the time). Based on the play by Patrick Hamilton, it aired in a 70-minute time-slot on non-commercial ABC.

Plot
Two friends, Granello and Brandon, commit murder for the thrill of it. They hide the body in their apartment and invite the family and friends of their victim over for a party.

Cast
John Meillon
Bruce Beeby
Don Pascoe
Roger Climpson
June Collis
Tom Farley
Keith Jervis

Production
Rehearsals started in July 1957. Star John Meillon just finished a long run on stage in The Reluctant Debutante. It was recorded in Sydney and broadcast live. A tape recording was later broadcast in Melbourne. It was Meillon's first TV play.

Reception
According to an article on 19 September 1957 edition of The Age, the broadcast was well received by viewers during its Sydney telecast, and producer Sterling was happy with the quality of the kinescope/telerecording.

1959 Australian TV Version
The play was filmed again for Australian TV in 1959, this time shot in Melbourne for ATN Channel 7.

See also
List of live television plays broadcast on Australian Broadcasting Corporation (1950s)

References

External links
Rope on IMDb
Copy of set design at Tribute Site for ABC Gore Hill

1957 television plays
1950s Australian television plays
Australian Broadcasting Corporation original programming
English-language television shows
Black-and-white Australian television shows
Australian live television shows
Films directed by William Sterling (director)